Oakland Mills High School was established in 1973 as one of the first high schools to serve the planned developed new U.S. town of Columbia, Maryland area, established by James Rouse and his Rouse Company in 1967 in Howard County, midway between Baltimore and Washington, D.C. It is part of the Howard County Public Schools system (HCPSS).

The building had its first renovation in 1991, and another in 1998. A new addition was put onto OMHS in 2004, the "new wing," raising its total capacity to 1,400 students.

Recently, both Oakland Mills High School and Oakland Mills Middle School were affected by a mold issue which required renovations to both schools. While Oakland Mills High has not needed more renovations, after Oakland Mills Middle suffered a fire early January 2016, it was discovered that the mold issue was not solved and required more renovations. It is unknown if there is any mold currently in Oakland Mills High School.

Demographics
Oakland Mills is one of the largest minority-majority schools in the Howard County Public School System. Of the student body, 43.9% are African American, 20.2% are White, 21.6% are Hispanic, 6.6% are Asian, 0% are Native American, and 7.2% are two or more races.

For students receiving special services in the 2016-2017 year, as many as 6.1% were with limited English proficiency, 44.9% received free/reduced lunches, and 10.1% were enrolled in special education. The graduation rate was 90.4%.

Academics
Since 2009, at least one member of its graduating class has been accepted into an Ivy League school, while graduates of each class have matriculated to prestigious schools such as Oberlin College, Carnegie Mellon University, Georgetown University, the Juilliard School, the Massachusetts Institute of Technology (MIT), and Stanford University.

In the 2009–2010 school year about 30% of students were enrolled in GT classes and about 20% in AP classes, according to the High School Needs/Data Assessment. The enrollment of students in OMHS's 18 AP courses has increased by 4% since 2008; this includes a 3% increase of African American students and a 2% increase of Hispanic students.

Students have been successful in higher-level classes. 89% of OMHS students who took the English Language and Composition AP/GT exam received a passing score of 3 or higher, and 86% of students who took the World History AP/GT exam received a 3 or higher. Both of these numbers impressively exceed the national average pass rate of 53%.

From the 2009–2010 school year to the 2010–2011 school year, there has been a 12.5% increase in the size of the OMHS National Honor Society. Currently, 38% of the students in NHS are minorities and 14% are African American.

Since 2009, there have been 67 Maryland Distinguished Scholars: six semifinalists, and nine finalists. There were 19 National Merit Scholars and five finalists. In the class of 2011, OMHS had six National Achievement Scholars, a program for African American students. Of those six, two were finalists.

Activities
The school also has an accomplished music and drama program. The choir, band, and orchestra are consistently given high ratings at various adjudications and festivals, including the annual WBAL Kids Campaign concert held at the school. Singers from the choir program have performed live on radio for the WBAL Kids Campaign. The Oakland Mills High School Chamber Singers are an active ensemble in their community. The select ensemble has been invited twice to the University of Maryland College Park high school invitational. Multiple members have been a part of nearby select ensembles such as the Maryland All State choirs and Howard County GT/Honor Choir. Oakland Mills has participated twice in the Baltimore area Critics and Awards Program for High School Students (the "Cappies").  The 2005 show, Footloose was nominated for 11 awards, winning two (Ensemble in a Musical and Cameo Actress).  The 2006 spring musical, Seussical, was nominated for 13 awards.

The school is also home to over 30 clubs and organizations, including Howard County's only Air Force JROTC program.

The school's boys' cross country team has won a state record 12 cross country state titles, including six in a row in the late eighties and early nineties.  The team also had a surge of championships around the start of the 21st century, including some narrow victories over Glenelg High School.

Athletics
Oakland Mills High School has won many state championships.  Here is a list of the titles that the school owns:

Boys' basketball
1990 - Boys' basketball
2015 - Boys' basketball
Girls' basketball
1998 - Girls' basketball
Boy's indoor track
1991 - Boys' 3A indoor track
1993 - Boys' 2A-1A indoor track
1994 - Boys' 2A-1A indoor track
1999 - Boys' 2A-1A indoor track
2000 - Boys' 2A-1A indoor track
2001 - Boys' 2A-1A indoor track
2002 - Boys' 2A-1A indoor track
2004 - Boys' 2A-1A Indoor Track
Boys' track & field
1981 - Boys' track & field
1989 - Boys' track & field
1991 - Boys' track & field
1993 - Boys' track & field
1994 - Boys' track & field
1995 - Boys' track & field
1996 - Boys' track & field
1998 - Boys' track & field
2000 - Boys' track & field
2001 - Boys' track & field
2002 - Boys' track & field
2004 - Boys' track & field
2010 - Boys' track & field
2021 - Boys' track & field
Girls' track & field
1978 - Girls' track & field 
Girls' indoor track
1998 - Girls' 2A-1A indoor track
2000 - Girls' 2A-1A indoor track
Wrestling
1980 - Wrestling
1982 - Wrestling
1986 - Wrestling
2015 - Wrestling
Boys' cross country
1975 - Boys' cross country
1984 - Boys' cross country
1985 - Boys' cross country
1986 - Boys' cross country
1987 - Boys' cross country
1988 - Boys' cross country
1989 - Boys' cross country
1992 - Boys' cross country
1994 - Boys' cross country
1999 - Boys' cross country
2000 - Boys' cross country
2001 - Boys' cross country
Boys' soccer
1979 - Boys' soccer
1980 - Boys' soccer
1981 - Boys' soccer
1985 - Boys' soccer
1986 - Boys' soccer
1988 - Boys' soccer
1992 - Boys' soccer
1994 - Boys' soccer
1998 - Boys' soccer
1999 - Boys' soccer
2000 - Boys' soccer
2002 - Boys' soccer
Girls' soccer
1992 - Girls' soccer
1995 - Girls' soccer
Football
1998 - Football

Notable alumni
Darryl Gee — US Olympic soccer player
Brandon Hardesty - actor, comedian
David Howard — 7th round pick (241 overall) by the Tennessee Titans in the 2010 NFL Draft
Ameen Khosravian — professional basketball player, Fiba
Lucy McBath - Congresswoman representing Georgia's 6th District
Aaron McGruder — creator of comic strip and TV show The Boondocks
Bree Newsome — activist
Randy Pausch (class of 1978) — professor at Carnegie Mellon University who gained a level of internet and YouTube fame for recording what is known as his inspirational "Last Lecture" due to a battle with terminal pancreatic cancer
Clint Peay — fullback, men's national team player, DC United Star, and US Olympic soccer player
Rob Ryerson — former professional soccer player, soccer coach at Mount St. Mary's University
Rich Ryerson — former professional soccer player, head coach of the UNLV Rebels men's soccer team
Dave Sitek — musician in the band TV on the Radio
Terry W. Virts (class of 1985) — NASA astronaut
Dante Washington — men's national team player, MLS scorer, and US Olympic soccer player
 Greg Whittington - basketball player

References and notes

External links

Official OMHS website
OMHS First Fifteen Years Reunion, Oakland Mills High Alumni, "1975-1989 Reunion"
Dr. Randy Pausch, OMHS alumnus, "Final Lecture"

Public high schools in Maryland
Public schools in Howard County, Maryland
Educational institutions established in 1973
1973 establishments in Maryland